Minuscule 674 (in the Gregory-Aland numbering), ε 271 (von Soden), is a Greek minuscule manuscript of the New Testament, on parchment. Palaeographically it has been assigned to the 12th century. The manuscript has survived in a very fragmentary condition. Scrivener labelled it by 620e.

Description 

The codex contains the text of the Gospel of Matthew 10:42-12:43, on 4 parchment leaves (size ), The text is written in one column per page, 26 lines per page.

There is also a division according to the Ammonian Sections, with a references to the Eusebian Canons. It contains a lectionary markings;  (lessons) were added by a later hand.

Text 

The Greek text of the codex is a representative of the Byzantine text-type.  Kurt Aland placed it in Category V.

It was not examined by using the Wisse's Profile Method.

History 

Scrivener and Gregory dated it to the 12th century. Currently the manuscript is dated by the INTF to the 12th century.

The manuscript was bought in 1876 from Tischendorf's collection (along with Minuscule 675). It was added to the list of New Testament manuscripts by Scrivener and Gregory. Gregory saw it in 1883. It was examined by Hort and Brandshaw.

Actually the manuscript is housed at the Cambridge University Library (Add. Mss. 1879.11) in Cambridge.

See also 

 List of New Testament minuscules
 Biblical manuscript
 Textual criticism

References

Further reading 

 

Greek New Testament minuscules
12th-century biblical manuscripts
Manuscripts in Cambridge